North Reading (pronounced, as is with Reading as  is a town in Middlesex County, Massachusetts, United States. The population was 15,554 at the 2020 census.

History
The area was first settled in 1651 when the town of Reading received a special land grant north of the Ipswich River. It was officially incorporated as the separate town of North Reading in 1853. 
North Reading borders Andover, North Andover, Middleton, Lynnfield, Reading, and Wilmington.

A historical source wrote:
Original grants of large farmsteads along the river during the mid-17th century brought six families to the settlement before 1680. The economy of the town in the 17th and 18th century was based on subsistence farming with limited hop production. There was a sawmill on Lob's Pond by 1694 and grist and saw mills at the village center by 1794. Some small scale boot and shoe making was underway by 1820, and by 1850 small sheds or shops to make shoes were attached to almost every house in town. These shops produced cheap footwear that was sold south to clothe slaves, and the Civil War destroyed the town's industry. The principal products of the town in the early 20th century were milk, apples and fruits.

Geography
According to the United States Census Bureau, the town has a total area of 13.5 square miles (35.0 km), of which 13.2 square miles (34.3 km) is land and 0.2 square miles (0.6 km), or 1.85%, is water.

Demographics

As of the census of 2000, there were 13,837 people, 4,795 households, and 3,754 families residing in the town. The racial makeup of the town was 97.53% White, 0.40% African American, 0.04% Native American, 1.30% Asian, 0.01% Pacific Islander, 0.24% from other races, and 0.48% from two or more backgrounds. Hispanic or Latino of any race were 0.74% of the population.

There were 4,795 households, out of which 40.0% had children under the age of 18 living with them, 68.9% were married couples living together, 7.0% had a female householder with no husband present, and 21.7% were non-families. 17.9% of all households were made up of individuals, and 6.1% had someone living alone who was 65 years of age or older.  The average household size was 2.86 and the average family size was 3.28.

In the town, the population was spread out, with 27.5% under the age of 18, 5.5% from 18 to 24, 31.4% from 25 to 44, 25.2% from 45 to 64, and 10.4% who were 65 years of age or older.  The median age was 38 years. For every 100 females, there were 97.1 males.  For every 100 females age 18 and over, there were 94.5 males.

The median income for a household in the town was $76,962, and the median income for a family was $86,341. Males had a median income of $52,446 versus $39,458 for females. The per capita income for the town was $30,902.  About 0.7% of families and 1.5% of the population were below the poverty line, including 0.4% of those under age 18 and 2.8% of those age 65 or over.

Government

The North Reading Board of Selectmen has five members who are elected to serve three-year overlapping terms.  As specified in the Town Charter and the Massachusetts General Laws, they are the chief elected officers of the town. The board may enact rules and regulations in a variety of areas, as well as establish town policies and procedures on many issues, unless such issues are delegated by law or vote of the town meeting to another officer or board. The board appoints a Town Administrator who supervises and is responsible for the day-to-day operation of town government departments.

Education

 North Reading High School
 North Reading Middle School
 E. Ethel Little School
 Turner Hood School
 L. D. Batchelder School

Infrastructure

Emergency services

North Reading is protected by the North Reading Fire Department and North Reading Police Department.  The fire department is staffed by full-time members, and is supplemented by a smaller call member roster.

Notable people

 William Taylor Adams (1822–1897), author under the name "Oliver Optic"
 Jonathan Bird (born 1969), Emmy-winning television producer
 Alexandra Carpenter (born 1994), ice hockey player with the KRS Vanke Rays. Carpenter played with the Boston College Eagles, the Boston Pride, and was a member of Team USA at the 2014 Winter Olympics
 Edward J. Collins, Jr. (1943–2007), government official
 Jon Favreau (born 1981), director of speechwriting for Barack Obama, co-founder of Crooked Media, and co-host of the political podcast Pod Save America
 Casey Fitzgerald (born 1997), ice hockey player with the Buffalo Sabres
 Ryan Fitzgerald (born 1994), ice hockey player with the Providence Bruins. Fitzgerald played with the Boston College Eagles and was picked in the 4th round of the 2013 NHL Entry Draft by the Boston Bruins
 Tom Fitzgerald (born 1968), general manager of the New Jersey Devils
 Art Kenney (1916–2014), Major League baseball player and principal of North Reading High School
 George Frederick Root (1820–1895), songwriter who found fame during the American Civil War
 Jimmy Vesey (born 1993), ice hockey player with the Buffalo Sabres. Vesey attended and played for North Reading High School, Belmont Hill School, and Harvard University prior to signing with the New York Rangers in 2016

References

External links

 
 Town of North Reading official website

 
Towns in Middlesex County, Massachusetts
Towns in Massachusetts
Populated places established in 1651
1651 establishments in Massachusetts